This is the list of awards and nominations received by the television series Big Love (2006–2011).

By award

Casting Society of America
2006: Best Casting for TV - Episodic Drama (Junie Lowry-Johnson, nominated)
2009: Best Casting for TV - Episodic Drama (Junie Lowry-Johnson, nominated)

Costume Designers Guild
2006: Outstanding Costume Design for TV Series - Contemporary (Chrisi Karvonides-Dushenko, nominated)
2007: Outstanding Costume Design for TV Series - Contemporary (Karvonides-Dushenko, nominated)

Emmy Awards

Golden Globe Awards

Satellite Awards

Writers Guild of America Awards

References

Big Love
Awards